Cornelius Sullivan (22 August 1928 – 14 April 2022) was an English footballer who played in the Football League for Arsenal and Bristol City.

Sullivan is arguably most notable for his part in a memorable own goal scored by team-mate Dennis Evans in a game against Blackpool in December 1955. With Arsenal winning 4–0, Sullivan and Evans heard what they thought was the final whistle, and while Sullivan turned to retrieve his cap, Evans kicked the ball past him into his own net. The whistle had in fact come from the crowd, and Evans' own goal counted; the match finished 4–1.

Sullivan died in April 2022, at the age of 93.

References

External links
 

1928 births
2022 deaths
English footballers
Footballers from Bristol
Association football goalkeepers
English Football League players
Bristol City F.C. players
Arsenal F.C. players